Jose Maria Martinez Salinas was an independent Honduran politician who served as the head of state of Honduras from 1 January 1837 to 28 May 1837 as well as from 3 September 1838 to 12 November 1838. He came to power in his second term after Justo José Herrera left office for unknown reasons. Martinez is largely known to be puppet of Francisco Ferrera around this time as well as one of the key players in causing the dissolution and removal of Honduras from the Federal Republic of Central America.

See also 

 List of presidents of Honduras
 Francisco Ferrera
Joaquin Rivera Bragas
 Justo José Herrera 
José Lino Matute

References 

Honduran politicians